Gharib Kandi (also Romanized as Gharīb Kandī; also known as Gharībābād) is a village in Torkaman Rural District, in the Central District of Urmia County, West Azerbaijan Province, Iran. At the 2006 census, its population was 194, in 50 families.

References 

Populated places in Urmia County